Huracanes en Luna plateada is the seventh album by Argentine rock band Los Piojos, released in 2002.

Track listing

Disc one 
 María Y José
 Babilonia
 Ximenita
 Taxi Boy
 A Veces
 Cancheros
 Yira - Yira (Con Omar Mollo)
 Muy Despacito
 Labios De Seda
 El Rey Del Blues
 Extraña Soledad

Disc two 
 Llevátelo
 Pensar En nada (Con León Gieco y Pappo)
 El Farolito
 Y Qué Más?
 Fijate
 Morella (Con Ricardo Mollo)
 Genius
 El Balneario De Los Doctores Crotos
 Little Red Rooster

External links 
 Huracanes en Luna plateada 

2002 live albums
Los Piojos albums
Live albums recorded in Buenos Aires